The Statute of Gloucester (6 Edw 1) is a piece of legislation enacted in the Parliament of England during the reign of Edward I. The statute, proclaimed at Gloucester in August 1278, was crucial to the development of English law. The Statute of Gloucester and the ensuing legal hearings were a means by which Edward I tried to recover regal authority that had been alienated during the reign of his father, King Henry III (1216–1272), who had been made a virtual tool of the baronial party, led by Simon de Montfort. Edward I recognized the need for the legal "reform" and considered Parliament as a means of buying popular support by encouraging loyal subjects to petition the King against his own barons and ministers.

The statute is the origin of the common law doctrine of waste, which allows successors with future interests in a piece of property to prevent current tenants, who do not hold the land in fee simple, from making substantial changes to the property that would decrease its value.

The statute of 1278 provided for several important legal amendments, including a modification of novel disseisin, one of the most popular forms of action for the recovery of land which had been seized illegally. It challenged baronial rights through a revival of the system of general eyres (royal justices to go on tour throughout the land) and through a significant increase in the number of pleas of quo warranto (literally, "By what warrant?") to be heard by such eyres. In such proceedings, individual barons and franchise holders were expected either to show the King's judges proper legal title by which they possessed their rights to private jurisdictions or to lose such rights.

It is the first statute recorded in a Statute Roll.

Chapter 1
The 6 Edw 1 c 1 is sometimes referred to as the Franchise Act 1278.

The 6 Edw 1 c 1 was repealed, except from "And whereas before Time" to "recover Damages", by section 2 of, and Part I of the Schedule to, the Civil Procedure Acts Repeal Act 1879.

See also
 Casu proviso

References

Footnotes

Works cited

External links
The Statute of Gloucester

Medieval English law
Acts of the Parliament of England
1278
1278 in England
1270s in law
Legal history of England
Edward I of England
Collection of The National Archives (United Kingdom)